{{Infobox film
| name            = The Blue Angel
| image           = Der blaue Engel poster.jpg
| caption         = Theatrical release poster
| native_name     = 
| director        = Josef von Sternberg
| producer        = Erich Pommer
| writer          = 
| based_on        = 
| starring        = 
| music           = 
| cinematography  = Günther Rittau
| editing         = 
| distributor     = Universum Film A.G.
| released        = 
| runtime         = 108 minutes
| country         = Germany
| language        = 
| gross           = $77,982 (2001 re-release)<ref name="imdb">{{IMDb title|0020697|The Blue Angel (1930)}}</ref>
| budget          =
}}The Blue Angel is a 1930 German musical comedy-drama film directed by Josef von Sternberg, and starring Marlene Dietrich, Emil Jannings and Kurt Gerron. Written by Carl Zuckmayer, Karl Vollmöller and Robert Liebmann – with uncredited contributions by Sternberg – it is based on Heinrich Mann's 1905 novel Professor Unrat (Professor Filth) and set in an unspecified northern German port city. The Blue Angel presents the tragic transformation of a respectable professor to a cabaret clown and his descent into madness. The film is the first feature-length German full-talkie and brought Dietrich international fame. In addition, it introduced her signature song, Friedrich Hollaender and Robert Liebmann's "Falling in Love Again (Can't Help It)". It is considered to be a classic of German cinema.

The film was shot simultaneously in German- and English-language versions, although the latter version was thought lost for many years. The German version is considered to be "obviously superior"; it is longer and not marred by actors struggling with their English pronunciation.

Plot summary

Immanuel Rath (Emil Jannings) is an educator at the local Gymnasium (high school for students expected to go to university) in Weimar Germany. The boys disrespect him and play pranks on him. Rath punishes several of his students for circulating photographs of the beautiful Lola Lola (Marlene Dietrich), the headliner for the local cabaret, "The Blue Angel". Hoping to catch the boys at the club, Rath goes there later that evening. He does find some students there, but while chasing them, he also finds Lola backstage and sees her partially disrobing. When he returns to the cabaret the following evening to return a pair of panties that were smuggled into his coat by one of his students, he ends up staying the night with her. The next morning, reeling from his night of passion, Rath arrives late to school to find his classroom in chaos; the principal is furious and threatens to fire Rath.

Rath gives up his position at the school to marry Lola. Their happiness is short-lived, however, as Rath becomes humiliatingly dependent on Lola. Over several years, he sinks lower and lower, first selling dirty postcards, and then becoming a clown in Lola's troupe to pay the bills. His growing insecurities about Lola's profession as a "shared woman" eventually consume him with lust and jealousy.

The troupe returns to his hometown and The Blue Angel, where everyone turns out to see the professor they knew play a clown. Once onstage, Rath is humiliated, not only by a magician who breaks eggs on his head but also by seeing Lola embrace and kiss the strongman Mazeppa. He is enraged to the point of insanity. He attempts to strangle Lola, but the strongman and others subdue him and lock him in a straitjacket.

Later that night, Rath is released. He leaves and goes to his old classroom. Rejected, humiliated, and destitute, he dies clutching the desk at which he once taught.

Cast

 Music 

"" ("Falling in Love Again (Can't Help It)")
music and lyrics by Friedrich Hollaender, sung by Marlene Dietrich
"" ("They Call Me Naughty Lola")
music by Friedrich Hollaender, lyrics by Robert Liebmann, sung by Marlene Dietrich
"" ("Beware of Blond Women")
music by Friedrich Hollaender, lyrics by Richard Rillo, sung by Marlene Dietrich
"" ("A Man, Just a Regular Man")
music by Friedrich Hollaender, lyrics by Robert Liebmann, sung by Marlene Dietrich

The film also features the famous carillon of the Garrison Church at Potsdam, playing "" (Always Be True and Faithful), as well as an orchestral version of the tune. The original melody was composed by Wolfgang Amadeus Mozart for Papageno's aria, in The Magic Flute. In the German Reich and subsequently the Weimar Republic, the lyrics of "" (Use always fidelity and honesty / Up to your cold grave; / And stray not one inch / From the ways of the Lord) symbolized the very embodiment of Prussian virtues.

Background
By 1929, Sternberg had completed a number of films for Paramount, none of which were box office successes. Fortunately for Sternberg, Paramount's sister studio in Germany, UFA, offered him the opportunity to direct Emil Jannings in his first sound film. Jannings was the Oscar-winning star of Sternberg's 1928 movie The Last Command, and had specially requested Sternberg's participation, despite an "early clash of temperaments" on the set.Baxter, 1971. p. 63

Though The Blue Angel and Morocco, both from 1930, are often cited as his first sound films, Sternberg had already directed "a startling experiment" in asynchronous sound techniques with his 1929 Thunderbolt.

Casting Lola Lola
Singer Lucie Mannheim was favored by UFA producer Erich Pommer for the part of Lola, with support from leading man Emil Jannings, but Sternberg vetoed her as insufficiently glamorous for a major production.  Sternberg also turned down author Mann's actress-girlfriend Trude Hesterberg. Brigitte Helm, seriously considered by Sternberg, was not available for the part. Sternberg and Pommer settled on stage and film actress Käthe Haack for the amount of 25,000 Reichsmarks.

Biographer Herman G. Weinberg, citing Sternberg's memoirs (1966) reports that the director had his first look at the 29-year-old Marie Magdalene "Marlene" Dietrich at a music revue named the Zwei Krawatten (Two Neckties), produced by dramatist Georg Kaiser.

Sternberg began immediately to groom Dietrich into "the woman he saw she could become".

Critic Andrew Sarris remarks on the irony of this singular director-actress relationship: "Josef von Sternberg is too often subordinated to the mystique of Marlene Dietrich...the Svengali-Trilby publicity that enshrouded The Blue Angel – and the other six Sternberg-Dietrich film collaborations – obscured the more meaningful merits not only of these particular works but of Sternberg's career as a whole."

Production
After arriving at Berlin's UFA studios, Sternberg declined an offer to direct a film about Rasputin, the former Russian spiritual advisor to the family of Czar Nicholas II. He was intrigued, however, by a story from socialist reformer Heinrich Mann entitled Professor Unrat (Professor Filth) (1905), which critiques "the false morality and corrupt values of the German middle class" and agreed to adapt it.Baxter, 1971. p. 63, p. 66

The narrative of Mann's story was largely abandoned by Sternberg (with the author's consent), retaining only scenes describing an affair between a college professor of high rectitude who becomes infatuated with a promiscuous cabaret singer. During the filming, Sternberg altered dialog, added scenes and modified cast characterizations that "gave the script an entirely new dimension."Weinberg, 1967. p. 50 The Professor's descent from sexual infatuation to jealous rage and insanity was entirely the director's invention.Weinberg, 1967. P.50

In order to maximize the film's profitability, The Blue Angel was filmed in both German and English, each shot in tandem for efficiency. The shooting spanned 11-weeks, from 4 November 1929 to 22 January 1930 at an estimated budget of $500,000—remarkably expensive for a UFA production of that period.Baxter, 1971. p. 63, 67 pp. 74–75

During filming, although he was still the nominal star of the film (with top billing), Jannings could see the growing closeness between Sternberg and Dietrich and the care the director took in presenting her, and the actor became jealous, engaging in histrionics and threatening to quit the production. The Blue Angel was to be his last great cinematic moment; it was also one of UFA's last successful films.Baxter, 1971. p. 63, pp. 74–75: The Blue Angel "had no successors at UFA" Film historian Andrew Sarris comments on this double irony:

ReleaseThe Blue Angel was scheduled for its Berlin premiere on 1 April 1930, but UFA owner and industrialist Alfred Hugenberg, unhappy with socialist Heinrich Mann's association with the production, blocked release. Production manager Pommer defended the film, and Mann issued a statement distancing his anti-bourgeois critique from Sternberg's more sympathetic portrayal of Professor Immanuel Rath in his movie version. Sternberg, who declared himself apolitical, had departed the country in February, shortly after the film was completed and the internecine conflict emerged. Hugenberg ultimately relented on the grounds of financial expediency, still convinced that Sternberg had concealed within The Blue Angel "a parody of the German bourgeoisie."Weinberg, 1967. p. 54: "Hugenberg [a political reactionary] had sensed that, within the framework of an entertainment film, Sternberg had subtly mirrored the paranoiac tendencies of the Prussian bourgeoisie."

The film proved to be "an instant international success."Weinberg, 1967. p. 54 Dietrich, at Sternberg's insistence, was brought to Hollywood under contract to Paramount, where they would film and release Morocco in 1930 before The Blue Angel would appear in American theatres in 1931.

Themes and analysisThe Blue Angel, ostensibly a story of the downfall of a respectable middle-age academic at the hands of a pretty young cabaret singer, is Sternberg's "most brutal and least humorous" film of his œuvre.Sarris, 1998. p. 121: "The Blue Angel (1930) [depicts] the downfall of a middle-aged bourgeois male through the machinations of a disreputable demi-mondaine..." The harshness of the narrative "transcends the trivial genre of bourgeois male corrupted by bohemian female" and the complexity of Sternberg's character development rejects "the old stereotype of the seductress" who ruthlessly cuckolds her men.

Film historian Andrew Sarris outlines Sternberg's "complex interplay" between Lola and the Professor:

Biographer John Baxter echoes this the key thematic sequence that reveals "the tragic dignity" of Rath's downfall:

When Rath, in a jealous rage, enters the room where his wife, Lola, is making love to the cabaret strongman, Mazeppa, Sternberg declines to show us Rath – now a madman – at the moment he is violently subdued by the authorities and placed in a straitjacket. Sternberg rewards the degraded Professor Rath for having "achieved a moment of masculine beauty [by] crowing like a maddened rooster" at Lola's deception: "Sternberg will not cheapen that moment by degrading a man who has been defeated." Sternberg presents "the spectacle of a prudent, prudish man blocked off from all means of displaying his manhood except the most animalistic." The loss of Lola leaves Rath with but one alternative: death.Sarris, 1998. p. 221: "Sternberg's profundity...is measured less by the breadth of this vision than by the perfection of his form and by the emotional force of his characters within that form."

Remakes, adaptations, and parodiesThe Blue Angel (1959). Director Edward Dmytryk's remake; with Curd JürgensPousse-Cafe, a 1966 Broadway musical version with music by Duke Ellington. It was unsuccessful and closed after three performances. Pinjra (1972) Marathi/Hindi. Director V. Shantaram's adaptation; with Sandhya and Shreeram Lagoo was highly successful.Lola (1981). Director Rainer Werner Fassbinder's loose adaptation of the film and its source novel
 The Royal Shakespeare Company produced a stage adaptation, written by Pam Gems and directed by Trevor Nunn, which toured the UK from 1991 to 1992.
 In 1998, the Gems adaptation was translated to Japanese. With added songs composed by accordionist Yasuhiro Kobayashi, the Japanese version was staged as a musical, starring Kenji Sawada, at the Bunkamura in Tokyo.
 A stage adaptation by Romanian playwright Răzvan Mazilu premiered in 2001 at the Odeon Theatre in Bucharest, starring Florin Zamfirescu as the professor and Maia Morgenstern as Lola Lola.
 In April 2010, Playbill announced that David Thompson was writing the book for a musical adaptation of The Blue Angel, with Stew and Heidi Rodewald providing the score, and Scott Ellis directing.
 Lola Lola's nightclub act has been parodied on film by Danny Kaye in drag as Fraulein Lilli in On the Double (1961) and by Helmut Berger in Luchino Visconti's The Damned (1969).

See also
List of German films of 1919–1932

References
Notes

Sources

 Baxter, John, 1971. The Cinema of Josef von Sternberg. London: A. Zwemmer / New York: A. S. Barnes & Co.
 Reimer, Robert C. and Reinhard Zachau, 2005. "German Culture Through Film." Newburyport, MA: Focus Publishing.
 Sarris, Andrew, 1966. The Films of Josef von Sternberg. New York: Doubleday
 Sarris, Andrew. 1998. "You Ain't Heard Nothin' Yet." The American Talking Film History & Memory, 1927–1949. Oxford University Press. 
 Tibbetts, John C., and James M. Welsh, eds. The Encyclopedia of Novels Into Film (2nd ed. 2005) pp 34–35.
 Weinberg, Herman G., 1967. Josef von Sternberg. A Critical Study. New York: Dutton.
 Wakeman, John. World Film Directors Vol. 1 (New York: H.W. Wilson, 1987)

External links

 
 
 
 
 
 
 Îngerul Albastru'' at Odeon Theatre (stage production) 
 Dissecting The Blue Angel – a structure breakdown.
 Notes on film: The Blue Angel

1930 films
1930 comedy-drama films
1930 multilingual films
1930 musical comedy films
1930s musical comedy-drama films
Adultery in films
Babelsberg Studio films
1930s English-language films
Films about educators
Films about entertainers
Films about musical theatre
Films based on German novels
Films directed by Josef von Sternberg
Films of the Weimar Republic
Films produced by Erich Pommer
Films scored by Friedrich Hollaender
Films set in the 1920s
Films set in cabarets
Films set in Germany
German black-and-white films
1930s German-language films
German multilingual films
German musical comedy-drama films
Tragicomedy films
UFA GmbH films
1930s German films